James Parkes may refer to:

 James Parkes (priest) (1896–1981), clergyman from Guernsey and scholar of Jewish–Christian relations
 James Parkes (rugby union) (born 1980), English rugby player
 Jim Parkes (rugby league), New Zealand rugby player
 James C.E. Parkes (1861–1903), first colonial Secretary for Native Affairs in Sierra Leone
 James S. Parkes, American Republican Party politician

See also 
 James Parks (disambiguation)
 James Parke (disambiguation)
 James Park (disambiguation)